A promise is a transaction whereby a person makes a vow or the suggestion of a guarantee.

Promise(s) may also refer to:

Places
Promise, Oregon
Promise, South Dakota
Promise City, Iowa
Promise Land, Tennessee or Promise

Film and TV
 Promise (1986 film), a Hallmark Hall of Fame television movie
 Promise (2005 film), a Finnish film
 Promise (2017 film), an Indonesian film
 Promises (1975 film) or Promise of the Flesh, a South Korean film
 Promises (2001 film), an Israeli documentary
 Promises (2021 film), a French-Italian romantic drama film
 Promised (film), a 2019 Australian film featuring Paul Mercurio

Television
 "Promise" (Kanon), an episode of Kanon
 "Promise" (Smallville), an episode of Smallville
 "Promises" (Farscape), an episode of Farscape
 "Promises" (Hercules: The Legendary Journeys), an episode of Hercules: The Legendary Journeys

Music
 Promise (rapper) (born 1982), Canadian hip–hop artist
 Promises (group), a late-1970s Canadian–American pop group

Albums (Promise)
 Promise (Gene Loves Jezebel album), 1983
 Promise (The Maybes? album), 2008
 Promise (Sade album), 1985
 Promise, a 2009 album of music composed by Tenmon for the films directed by Makoto Shinkai

Albums (Promises) 

Promises (The Boxer Rebellion album), 2013
 Promises (Floating Points, Pharoah Sanders and the London Symphony Orchestra album), 2021
Promises (The Hunters album), 2012
Promises, by the Michael Garrick Sextet, 1965
 Promises, an EP by Naomi Scott, 2016
Promises, an EP by Ryn Weaver, 2014

Songs ("Promise")
 "Promise" (Ciara song), 2006
 "Promise" (Delirious? song), 1997
 "Promise" (Jagged Edge song), 2000
 "Promise" (Kid Ink song), featuring Fetty Wap, 2015
 "Promise" (Kohmi Hirose song), 1997
 "Promise" (Luna Sea song), 2011
 "Promise" (Romeo Santos song), featuring Usher, 2011
 "Promise" (Tori Amos song), 2014
 "Promise" (Voyager song), Australian song for the Eurovision Song Contest 2023
 "Promise"/"Star", a double A-side single by Kumi Koda, 2005
 "Promise (You and Me)", by Reamonn, 2006
 "Promise", by Akira Yamaoka from the soundtrack of the video game Silent Hill 2
 "Promise", by Alex Lifeson from Victor
 "Promise", by Black Rebel Motorcycle Club from Howl
 "Promise", by Cubic U (Hikaru Utada) from Precious
 "Promise", by Eve 6 from Horrorscope
 "Promise", by Girls' Generation from I Got a Boy
 "Promise", by Janet Jackson from Unbreakable
 "Promise", by Krezip from Days Like This
 "Promise", by Matchbook Romance from Stories and Alibis
 "Promise", by Pedro the Lion from It's Hard to Find a Friend
 "Promise", by Simple Plan from Still Not Getting Any...
 "Promise", by Slash featuring Chris Cornell from Slash
 "Promise", by Twice from Perfect World
 "Promise", by Vanessa Hudgens from her debut album V
 "Promise", by Violent Femmes from Violent Femmes

Songs ("Promises") 

"Promises" (7eventh Time Down song), 2015
 "Promises" (Andain song), 2011
 "Promises" (Barbra Streisand song), 1981
 "Promises" (Basia song), 1987
 "Promises" (Boy Kill Boy song), 2008
 "Promises" (Calvin Harris and Sam Smith song), 2018
 "Promises" (The Cranberries song), 1999
 "Promises" (Def Leppard song), 1999
 "Promises" (Eric Clapton song), 1978
 "Promises" (Maverick City Music song), 2020
 "Promises" (Nero song), 2011
 "Promises" (Randy Travis song), 1989
 "Promises" (Sanctus Real song), 2012
 "Promises" (Take That song), 1991
 "Promises", by Adema from Unstable
 "Promises", by Aly & AJ from Ten Years
 "Promises", by Badly Drawn Boy from Born in the U.K.
 "Promises", by Billie Piper from Walk of Life
 "Promises", by Buzzcocks (non-album single)
 "Promises", by Dragon from Body and the Beat
 "Promises", by Kylie Minogue from Body Language
 "Promises", by Megadeth from The World Needs a Hero
 "Promises", by Mumzy Stranger from Journey Begins
 "Promises", by Savage Garden, B-side of the singles "I Want You" and "Truly Madly Deeply"
 "Promises", by Sugababes from One Touch
 "Promises", by Trevor Rabin from Can't Look Away
 "Promises", by Wiz Khalifa from Blacc Hollywood
 "Promises (As Years Go By)", a song by IQ from Nomzamo

Brands and enterprises
 Promise (brand), a brand of toothpaste in India
 Promise (margarine), the United States name for Becel margarine

Computing
 Futures and promises, the constructs used for synchronization in some concurrent computing
 Promise theory, a general theory of promises with applications in computing

Other uses
 Promises (book), a 2000 children's book by Elizabeth Winthrop, illustrated by Betsy Lewin
 Promises Treatment Centers, a provider of residential drug and alcohol rehabilitation facilities in California, U.S.

See also
 A Promise (disambiguation)
 I Promise (disambiguation)
 No Promises (disambiguation)
 Promise Me (disambiguation)
 Promises, Promises (disambiguation)
 The Promise (disambiguation)